The Andalusia City School District or Andalusia City Schools is the school district of Andalusia, Alabama. Andalusia City School District serves 1,785 students and employs 101 teachers and 66 staff as of the 2020-2021 school year. The district includes one elementary school, one middle school, and one high school.

Schools 
The Andalusia City School District consists of three schools:

 Andalusia Elementary School (PK-6)
 Andalusia Junior High School (7-8)
 Andalusia High School (9-12)

Governance 
Its superintendent is Dr. Daniel Shakespeare.

References

External links 
 Andalusia City Schools website

School districts in Alabama
Education in Covington County, Alabama